The Milan Triennial XIX was the Triennial in Milan sanctioned by the Bureau of International Expositions (BIE) on the 8 June 1994.
Its theme was Identities and Differences. 
It was held at the Palazzo dell'Arte and ran from 
22 February 1996 to 5 May 1996.

References 

1996 in Italy
Tourist attractions in Milan
World's fairs in Milan